The Derbeke-Nelgesinsky mine is one of the largest silver mines in Russia and in the world. The mine is located in the Nelgesin Range area, Sakha Republic. The mine has estimated reserves of 160 million oz of silver.

References

External links
Orogenic Gold Mineralization of the Adycha Ore Region (East Yakutia, Russia): Geological Setting and Geochemical Features of Gold–Quartz Ores

Silver mines in Russia